Union Mills is an unincorporated community in Noble Township, LaPorte County, Indiana.

History
Joseph Wheaton, one of the earliest settlers, came to the Mill Creek in 1832 and laid out a small village. The gristmill was built on Mill Creek was built in 1836 by Sylvanus Everts. Everts named the mill "Union Mills" and Wheaton's village followed to be known as Union Mills. In 1838 the village had only five log houses. A general store opened in 1840. The construction of three rail lines near Union Mills stimulated growth.

Union Mills was platted in 1849, but there had been a settlement at the site for some time prior. The community took its name from a gristmill constructed in the 1830s.

Geography

Education
Union Mills has a public library, a branch of the LaPorte County Public Library.

Union Mills has a public school, South Central, that provides education from Kindergarten through 12th grade.

Notable people
Ed Hanyzewski, baseball player
Glen Rosenbaum, baseball player and coach

References

Unincorporated communities in LaPorte County, Indiana
Unincorporated communities in Indiana